Alfonso Carafa (died 1534) was a Roman Catholic prelate who served as Bishop of Lucera (1512–1534), 
Bishop of Sant'Agata de' Goti (1505–1512), and 
Titular Patriarch of Antioch (1504–1505).

Biography
In 1504, he was appointed  Titular Patriarch of Antioch by Pope Julius II.
On 30 July 1505, he was appointed Bishop of Sant'Agata de' Goti by Pope Julius II.
On 27 August 1512, he was appointed Bishop of Lucera by Pope Julius II.
He served as Bishop of Lucera until his death in 1505.

References

External links and additional sources
 (for Chronology of Bishops) 
 (for Chronology of Bishops) 
 (for Chronology of Bishops) 
 (for Chronology of Bishops) 
 (for Chronology of Bishops)  
 (for Chronology of Bishops)  

16th-century Italian Roman Catholic bishops
Bishops appointed by Pope Julius II
1534 deaths